USNS PFC Eugene A. Obregon (T-AK-3006), (former SS PFC Eugene A. Obregon (AK-3006)), is the second ship of the  built in 1982. The ship is named after Private First Class Eugene A. Obregon, an American Marine who was awarded the Medal of Honor during the Korean War.

Construction and commissioning 
The ship was built in 1982 at the Sun Shipbuilding, Chester, Pennsylvania. She was put into the service of Waterman Steamship Corp. as Thomas Heyward.

In 1985, she was acquired and chartered by the Navy under a long-term contract as SS PFC Eugene A. Obregon (AK-3006). The ship underwent conversion at the National Steel and Shipbuilding, San Diego.

In January 2010, PFC Eugene A. Obregon was put into the Maritime Prepositioning Ship Squadron 1, based in the Atlantic Ocean. On 14 September later that year, she arrived in the Bay of Naples.

She was later transferred to the Military Sealift Command Surge Sealift as USNS PFC Eugene A. Obregon (T-AK-3006) from 1 October 2012.

Crowley Government Services Inc. was awarded $14,513,105 to maintain USNS LCPL Roy M. Wheat (T-AK-3016), USNS Sgt. Matej Kocak (T-AK-3005), USNS Maj. Stephen W. Pless (T-AK-3007) and PFC Eugene A. Obregon on 29 September 2020.

References

Sgt. Matej Kocak-class cargo ship
1982 ships
Ships built in Chester, Pennsylvania
Merchant ships of the United States
Cargo ships of the United States Navy
Container ships of the United States Navy